Second Nature is a long-form improvisational theatre troupe based in Los Angeles at the University of Southern California.

Second Nature was founded on November 19, 2002.  The troupe performs every Sunday night in USC's E.F. Hutton Park, providing free, comedic, one-hour shows.  Second Nature regularly performs with other improv troupes from all over Los Angeles, and the United States.  The collegiate troupe is known for the Fracas! Improv Festival, one of the largest intercollegiate improv comedy festivals in the world.  Additionally, Second Nature pioneered The Facebook Show, an improvised comedy show based entirely on the Facebook profiles of audience volunteers.

Since its debut, Second Nature has become a regular part of campus life at USC, and has begun the careers of several comedians, actors, and directors.

History 
Second Nature was founded in 2002 by a group of USC students interested in performing improvised comedy.  The troupe is a recognized student organization within the University of Southern California.  The group chose the name Second Nature based on the idea that performing spontaneous theatre should become "second nature" to the cast.

The style of Second Nature's comedy has changed with time, as the students have become more passionate and knowledgeable about improvisational theatre.  Originally, Second Nature performed ComedySportz style shows, with the troupe split into two competing factions.  After being influenced by The Upright Citizens Brigade Theatre and The Groundlings with whom the troupe had taken workshops, Second Nature adopted a more free flowing scenic style of improvisation.  For the past few years, the troupe has been performing predominantly long-form improvisation, focusing on The Harold and The Armando, while occasionally performing other forms such as Text Message, The Town and The Bat.

Though Second Nature is fairly young, a number of professional performers began their careers with the troupe.

The Fracas! Improv Festival 

The Fracas! Improv Festival, or Fracas!, is an improvisational theatre festival created and hosted by Second Nature, and held annually at the University of Southern California in Los Angeles since 2004.

Over the past few years, Fracas! has grown into a national festival with more than a dozen participating universities, as well as workshops and panels with professionals from The Upright Citizens Brigade, The Groundlings, The Office, Mad TV, ImprovOlympic and more.

The Facebook Show 

Once a month, Second Nature performs Special Format Shows which contain either a special show format, or a special guest.  As many special format shows are experimental, few receive a strong enough audience reaction to be performed multiple times.  A notable exception is The Facebook Show.

The Facebook Show consists of three segments, roughly twenty minutes each.  Each segment begins with an audience member volunteering to be interviewed by Second Nature.  During the interview, the audience member logs on to their Facebook profile, which is projected on a screen, and explored in front of the live audience.  Finally, Second Nature uses material from the volunteer's Facebook profile as the basis for their improvisation.

Second Nature's first Facebook Show was performed in 2005, when Facebook was open only to college students.  However, since the social networking website has been opened up to the public, the show has become popular with a larger audience.

Influenced by Second Nature, other groups have begun performing the Facebook Show around the world, including at the University of California, Santa Barbara, by jericho! at the University of California, Berkeley, and in England by the Canterbury based troupe, Noise Next Door.

Guest Monologists 
One of the many show formats Second Nature performs is The Armando.  This format - developed at ImprovOlympic - involves a guest monologist (frequently a celebrity) who uses a suggestion from the audience to inspire a truthful, personal monologue.  The improvisers then use the monologue as inspiration for a series of scenes, which in turn inspire a response from the monologist.

Second Nature has performed The Armando with the following guest monologists:
Dan Oster, MADtv
Kate Flannery, The Office
Paul Wolff, screenwriter, Family Ties, Little House on the Prairie, Home Improvement ; executive story-editor, Remington Steele
Tom Lennon, Reno 911!, The State
Will Sasso, MADtv
Midori, prominent human sexuality writer, speaker, and sex educator
Daniel Handler, aka  Lemony Snicket, author of A Series of Unfortunate Events

Current Cast 
Alannah Fredericks
Liam Stephenson
Henry Parker-Elder
Will Hunt
Angie Stroud
Devin Harris
Greta Donnelly
Ian Grady
Jillian Gorman

Notable alumni
Shelby Fero, Emmy award-winning stand-up comedian and staff writer for Robot Chicken, @midnight, Idiotsitter, and more.
Devin Field, UCB performer and staff writer for Jimmy Kimmel Live!, Workaholics, and Billy on the Street.
Dan Lippert, UCB performer and actor, Comedy Bang! Bang! regular.
Zach Dunn, UCB performer, staff writer for Go90's Mr. Student Body President.
Philip Labes, UCB performer, actor on Netflix's GLOW and Funny or Die's Tween Fest.
Jacob Reed, UCB performer.
Sarah Khasrovi, UCB performer.

See also
Improvisational theatre
List of improvisational theatre companies
Upright Citizens Brigade Theatre
Del Close

External links
Second Nature website
Official website of The Fracas! Improv Festival
The Fracas! Podcast, audio and video interviews with professional improvisers
List of Second Nature alumni

Notes

American comedy troupes
Sketch comedy troupes
Theatre companies in Los Angeles
Improvisational troupes
Performing groups established in 2002
University performing groups
2002 establishments in California
Comedy collectives